Sarema may refer to:
 Sarema, an opera by Alexander von Zemlinsky with première in 1897
1012 Sarema, asteroid, named after the opera
 Saaremaa, an island in Estonia